Colla jehlei is a moth in the Bombycidae family. It was described by Schade in 1939. It is found in Paraguay.

References

Natural History Museum Lepidoptera generic names catalog

Bombycidae
Moths described in 1939